WEAI may refer to:

 WEAI (FM), a radio station (107.1 FM) licensed to Lynnville, Illinois, United States
 Weatherhead East Asian Institute, a community of scholars at Columbia University
 Western Economic Association International, an academic society for research in economics